Sharpe's lobe-billed parotia, also known as Sharpe's lobe-billed riflebird, is a bird in the family Paradisaeidae that is an intergeneric hybrid between a long-tailed paradigalla and western parotia.

History
Only one subadult male specimen is known of this hybrid, held in the British Natural History Museum, presumably deriving from the Vogelkop Peninsula of north-western New Guinea.  It is named after its describer, British ornithologist Richard Bowdler Sharpe.

Notes

References
 

Hybrid birds of paradise
Birds of New Guinea
Intergeneric hybrids